The 1848 United States presidential election in New Jersey took place on November 7, 1848, as part of the 1848 United States presidential election. Voters chose seven representatives, or electors to the Electoral College, who voted for President and Vice President.

New Jersey voted for the Whig candidate, Zachary Taylor, over Democratic candidate Lewis Cass and Free Soil candidate former president Martin Van Buren. Taylor won the state by a narrow margin of 4.01%.

Results

See also
 United States presidential elections in New Jersey

References

New Jersey
1848
1848 New Jersey elections